Hemangi Worlikar is a Shiv Sena politician from Mumbai, Maharashtra.

Positions held

 2012: Elected as corporator in Brihanmumbai Municipal Corporation 
 2016: Elected as chairman of Education Committee in Brihanmumbai Municipal Corporation 
 2017: Re-elected as corporator in Brihanmumbai Municipal Corporation 
 2017: Elected as Deputy Mayor of Brihanmumbai Municipal Corporation

References

External links
 Shivsena Home Page
 बृहन्मुंबई महानगरपालिका

Living people
Shiv Sena politicians
Marathi politicians
Maharashtra politicians
Year of birth missing (living people)